Zarrin Choqa Shahid Jabari (also Romanized as Zarrīn Choqā Shahīd Jābarī; also known as Zarrīn Choghā Shahīd Jābarī, Zarrīnchoghā-ye Vosţá, and Zarrīn Choghā) is a village in Robat Rural District, in the Central District of Khorramabad County, Lorestan Province, Iran. At the 2006 census, its population was 147, in 31 families.

References 

Towns and villages in Khorramabad County